Mary Jane Irving (October 20, 1913 – July 17, 1983) was an American actress. She appeared in 58 films between 1917 and 1938.

Biography
Born in Columbia, South Carolina, Irving began her career as a child actor in silent films. A popular child actor, Irving was relegated to secondary roles as a teen and, after her marriage to screenwriter Robert Carson in 1938, she retired from films. 

Seven months after her husband's death, Irving died in Los Angeles, California.

Filmography

References

External links
 
 

1913 births
1983 deaths
American child actresses
American film actresses
American silent film actresses
Actresses from Columbia, South Carolina
20th-century American actresses